Scottia may refer to:
 Scottia (crustacean), a genus in the family Cyprididae
 Scottia Thunb., a synonym of the legume genus Schotia
 Scottia R.Br. ex Ait., 1812, a synonym of the legume genus Bossiaea
 Scottia Grönblad, 1954, a synonym for Amscottia Grönblad, 1954, a Chlorophyta incertae sedis

See also 
 Scotia (disambiguation)